Monsieur Leguignon, Signalman (French: Monsieur Leguignon lampiste) is a 1952 French comedy film directed by Maurice Labro and starring Yves Deniaud, Jane Marken and Bernard Lajarrige. It was shot at the Boulogne Studios in Paris. The film's sets were designed by the art director Paul-Louis Boutié. It was based on a radio programme and was followed by a sequel Leguignon the Healer in 1954.

Synopsis
A signalman employed by the SNCF constantly has to deal with difficult situations in spite of his well-meaning efforts. After a dispute with a group of children who lay claim to some treasure discovered in a dilapidated shack that he uses, the matter ends up in court.

Cast 
 Yves Deniaud as Diogène Leguignon
 Jane Marken as Mrs. Leguignon
 Bernard Lajarrige as Mr. Follenfant
 Pierre Larquey as Mr. Petitot
 Roland Armontel as Mr. Maltestu
 Christiane Barry as Louise
 Jean Carmet as Mr. Grosjean, policeman
 Jacques Emmanuel as Mr. Pabroc
 Paul Faivre as Mr. Paulin
 Pierre Magnier as Général de Saint Bouquet
 Henri Niel as M. Chadoul 
 Jean Berton as M. Caïman
 Christian Argentin as Advocate
 Georges Baconnet as A local resident
 Paul Mercey as A local resident
 Louis de Funès as A local resident
 Pierre Havet as	Le secrétaire de Pabroc
 Albert Duvaleix as Le président de la 9ème chambre correctionnelle
 Marcel Josz as Le président de la 11ème chambre correctionnelle
 Robert Lussac as 	Le président de la 13ème chambre correctionnelle
 Claude Boissol as 	Le substitut #1 
 Jean Brunel as 	Le substitut #2
 Georges Tourreil as 	Le substitut #2
 Alain Chanu as reporter

References

Bibliography
Dyer, Richard & Vincendeau, Ginette. Popular European Cinema. Routledge, 2013.
 Rège, Philippe. Encyclopedia of French Film Directors, Volume 1. Scarecrow Press, 2009.

External links 
 
 Monsieur Leguignon, lampiste (1952) at the Films de France

1952 films
French comedy films
1950s French-language films
French black-and-white films
Films directed by Maurice Labro
1952 comedy films
Films shot at Boulogne Studios
1950s French films